Arlene "Kaka" J. Bag-ao (born July 3, 1969) is a Filipino human rights lawyer and agrarian reform advocate who served as Governor of the Dinagat Islands from 2019 until her defeat in 2022. Bag-ao additionally served as the representative for the lone district of the Dinagat Islands from 2013 until 2019. She has been dubbed as the 'Dragon Slayer' after consecutively defeating two of the most prominent members of the influential Ecleo political dynasty of the Dinagat Islands.

Education 

Born in Manila, but raised in Loreto, Surigao del Norte (now part of Dinagat Islands), Bag-ao took her elementary education at Loreto Central Elementary School. She then took her secondary education at Southeastern College in Pasay. Bag-ao earned her Bachelor of Arts degree in Political Science from the De La Salle University in 1989, and her Juris Doctor (JD) degree from the Ateneo Law School of the Ateneo de Manila University in 1993, where she became a Judge de Veyra Scholarship Awardee and an Ateneo School of Law Scholarship Awardee. She passed the Philippine Bar Examinations in 1994. She was a Law and Human Rights Humphrey Fellow — in the Academic Year 2006-2007 - at the University of Minnesota, under a program implemented by the Fulbright Commission of the United States of America.

Early career

Alternative lawyer 
Bag-ao is one of the founders and the former Executive Director of BALAOD Mindanaw, a law group based in Mindanao, the Philippines working for the advancement and protection of the rights of farmers, fisherfolks, indigenous peoples and women's and other marginalized groups through the creative and developmental use of the law.

As an alternative lawyer, she is also involved in policy reform both at the local and national levels, working with different advocacy groups and law school based organizations in the country. She provides paralegal training and legal clinics to grassroots organizations and has won cases with them.

Bag-ao is a member of the independent secretariat to the peace talks between the Government of the Republic of the Philippines and the Revolutionary Worker's Party of Mindanao (RPMM) that facilitated the signing of the agreement on the cessation of hostilities and the agreement to integrate community consultations as an essential component of the peace process.

In 2004, Bag-ao was asked to become the special consultant to the Secretary of the Department of Agrarian Reform and facilitated the awarding of numerous land titles to farmer-beneficiaries. She was also responsible for the formulation and issuance of a Memorandum Circular — later affirmed by the Supreme Court — requiring the DAR to proceed with the acquisition and distribution of lands to farmer-beneficiaries despite injunction orders issued by regular courts.
Bag-ao provided leadership for the Alternative Law Groups (ALG), as a Convenor in 2005-2006 and as a Council Member thereafter. 

The ALG is a coalition of twenty (20) alternative legal resource non-government organizations engaged in developmental lawyering in different parts of the country. Under Bag-ao's leadership, the ALG implemented a program in partnership with the Supreme Court which complemented its Action Program on Judicial Reform and resulted in the Supreme Court's programs on access to justice by the poor. The ALG also pushed for the enactment of several social legislations, including the enactment of the Juvenile Justice Law and the Supreme Court ruling on the indefeasibility of titles issued under the agrarian reform program.

Bag-ao was the lead counsel in the Sumilao Farmers' case, a case of indigenous farmers who walked for 1,700 kilometers from Bukidnon, Mindanao to Manila to claim rights to their lands under agrarian reform against one of the biggest corporations in the Philippines. The Sumilao Farmers' case generated national and international attention and support. The case also inspired the Church to shepherd their cause and eventually resulted in an agreement under which the farmers would be given back their land.

Political career

Congressional career

Akbayan Representative (2010-2013) 
On 30 June 2010, Bag-ao was sworn in as the second representative of Akbayan Party in the 15th Philippine Congress.

Together with fellow Akbayan Representative Walden Bello, she is the author of numerous progressive bills in Congress such as House Bill 3763 (Minerals Management Bill), House Bill 513 (Reproductive Health Bill), House Bill 468 (Sangguniang Kabataan Reform and Empowerment Bill), House Bill 515 (Anti-Discrimination Bill), House Bill 5312 (Comprehensive HIV and AIDS Bill), and House Bill 4268 (Healthy Beverages Options Bill or the 'Chip's Bill').'Bag-ao is a principal author of Republic Act 10354 or the Reproductive Health Law. She is also the principal author of House Bill 6545 or the National Land Use Bill, which was passed by the House of Representatives.

Bag-ao was the vice-chairp of the House Committee on Agrarian Reform. She is one of the champions of Kaya Natin,'' a nongovernment organization founded by the late Interior and Local Government Secretary Jesse Robredo that advocates good governance and ethical leadership. She is also one of only two women public prosecutors in the impeachment trial of convicted Supreme Court Chief Justice Renato Corona.

Dinagat Islands Representative caretaker (2013) 

As a native of the province and through the endorsement of Surigao del Norte Representatives Francisco Matugas and Guillermo Romarate, Jr., Bag-ao was appointed by House Speaker Feliciano Belmonte, Jr. as the Legislative Liaison Officer or Caretaker of the Lone District of Dinagat Islands.

Upon her assumption as Dinagat caretaker, Bag-ao led a series of consultations in the province's 100 barangays, asking the residents of their community concerns and development projects they wish to see. In just three months, Bag-ao was able to roll-out the following development programs and projects:

 P3-million worth of free medical assistance at the Caraga Regional Hospital;
 P8-million worth of scholarships for the Dinagat youth at the Surigao State College of Technology (SSCT) and other state universities and colleges;
 P120-million worth of infrastructure projects for all barangays, including roads, bridges, water systems, barangay halls, barangay gym, sea walls, etc.; and
 77 "Sasakyan Ng Barangay" multicabs for faster delivery of government services even in the province's remotest communities.

Dinagat Islands Representative (2013-2019) 
At the May 2013 general elections, Bag-ao was elected representative of the Lone District of Dinagat Islands, edging out Dinagat municipal mayor Gwendolyn Ecleo with 3,248 votes. Bag-ao was dubbed as a 'Dragon Slayer' as she managed to defeat a political behemoth in her province.

In the 16th Congress, she was elected as the Chairperson of the Special Committee on Land Use.

She is the principal author of several legislative measures, such as the proposed National Land Use Act, the People's Freedom of Information Act, the Anti-Discrimination Bill, and the Agrarian Reform Commission Bill.

In November 2015, she, along with fellow legislators Rep. Leni Robredo (3rd District of Camarines Sur), Rep. Bolet Banal (3rd District of Quezon City), and Rep. Teddy Baguilat (Lone District of Ifugao), introduced a new proposed measure entitled the Open Door Policy Bill, which seeks to prohibit government offices from denying citizens access to front line services and public meetings on the basis of attire. The bill gained international recognition when it was featured in Time.com.

In January 2016, the Sangguniang Kabataan Reform Act was passed into law. Bag-ao is one of its principal authors in the House of Representatives through House Bill No. 109.

In the May 2016 elections, Bag-ao was reelected as representative of the lone district of Dinagat Islands, defeating this time Gwendolyn Ecleo's older sibling, Jade Ecleo, who was the province's former governor. She was again lauded as a 'Dragon Slayer' as she has defeated the two most prominent members of the Ecleo political dynasty in Dinagat Islands.

She has been pushing for the Anti-Discrimination Bill (now known as the SOGIE Equality Bill) to be passed into law since her assumption in the House of Representatives. Geraldine Roman has called her the "heart and soul" of the Anti-Discrimination Bill, to which she said that Roman is the "face of the Anti-Discrimination Bill" as she is the only transgender lawmaker in the country. Bag-ao is the pioneer of the Equality Champions Coalition between the Senate and the House of Representative, along with Senator Risa Hontiveros.

In March 2017, Bag-ao voted against the re-imposition of the death penalty in the Philippines. The ruling party in the Philippines stripped her committee chairmanship on People's Participation afterwards. She later said that she voted "no" because of her principle and her belief that the death penalty is always inhumane and wrong.

In September 2017, Bag-ao voted against a House budget ruling that shall give one thousand pesos (around 20 dollars) for the 2018 budget of the Commission on Human Rights in the Philippines. Bag-ao was one of the only 32 lawmakers to vote against the budget. The budget, however passed in the House after more than a hundred Duterte-allied lawmakers voted in its favor. Public outraged erupted afterwards, condemning the humongous budget cut for a commission responsible for looking at the human rights violations of the government. Protests were held in various cities nationwide. The budget was eventually restored to its original amount after a few days of public outcry against the budget cut.

On the same month, after 17 years of political limbo, the SOGIE Equality Bill finally passed in the House of Representative under Bag-ao's principal authorship. Bag-ao was the vice-chairperson of the House Committees on Ecology, Labor and Employment, and Population and Family Relations. She had influential political powers on the Committees on Women and Gender Equality, Natural Resources, Mindanao Affairs, Human Rights, Justice, and Constitutional Amendments, among many others.

In October 2017, she was one of the only two House committee members who voted against the sufficiency of the grounds to impeach Chief Justice Sereno. Bag-ao argued that many of the allegations being thrown at the Chief Justice are not sufficient and not even grounds for impeachment.

Authored legislation 
The following are some of the bills principally authored by Kaka Bag-ao and were deemed as priority legislation:
SOGIE Equality Act
National Land Use Act
Philippine HIV and AIDS Policy Act
Philippine Mineral Resources Act
Security of Tenure Act
Coconut Farmers Development Act
Agrarian Reform Commission Act
People's Freedom of Information Act
Open Door Policy Act
Land Acquisition and Distribution Completion Law
Barangay Security, Health, and Nutrition Worker's Benefits Act
Comprehensive Anti-Discrimination Act
Department of Ocean, Fisheries, and Aquatic Resources Act
Anti-Political Dynasty Act
Participatory Reform for Rural Development Act
On-Ste, In-City, or Near-City Resettlement Act
National Food Security Act
Right to Adequate Food Framework Act
Individual Income Tax Reduction Act
Pantawid Pamilyang Pilipino Act
Caraga Regional Hospital Upgrade Law
Local Population Development Act

Governor of Dinagat Islands (2019-2022) 
On May 13, 2019, Bag-ao was elected governor in the 2019 general election. Defeating Benglen Ecleo, a member of the Ecleo political clan. In the 2022 Philippine general election, Bag-ao failed in her bid for a second term as Governor.

Achievements 

2006 Hubert H. Humphrey Fellow for Law and Human Rights at the University of Minnesota.
2008 Frederik Ozanam Award for her work with the Sumilao Farmers. The award was "given to exemplary individuals who, in living out the demands of faith, justice, and love, have given distinctive and continued service to their brothers and sisters, especially the poor and suffering" during the Annual Academic Convocation of the Ateneo de Manila University.
2009 Parangal para sa Natatanging Indibidwal na Katuwang sa Pagsusulong ng Hustisyang Panlipunan by De La Salle University.
2010 Outstanding Women in the Nation's Service (TOWNS) Award in Alternative Lawyering.
2013 Rotary Outstanding Surigaonon Award (ROSA) for Law and Public Service by the Rotary Club of Metro Surigao
2013 Distinguished Leadership Award for Internationals under the Hubert H. Humphrey Fellowship by the University of Minnesota of the United States.
2014 Rainbow Award by the Quezon City Pride Council for her dedication on equality for all sexual orientations and gender identities.
2015 Freedom Flame Award by Friedrich Naumann Foundation for Freedom (FNF), one of the most prestigious freedom awards in contemporary history.

References

External links 
 

Living people
People from Dinagat Islands
Members of the House of Representatives of the Philippines from Dinagat Islands
Members of the House of Representatives of the Philippines for Akbayan
Ateneo de Manila University alumni
De La Salle University alumni
University of Minnesota fellows
1969 births
Governors of the Dinagat Islands
Liberal Party (Philippines) politicians